Athelicium is a genus of corticioid fungi in the family Atheliaceae. The genus contains two species known from Europe.

References

External links

Atheliales
Atheliales genera